Pocantico may refer to:
Pocantico Hills, New York
Pocantico River